Patrick Rama (born 25 May 1965) is a Lesotho and South African former long-distance runner. He competed in the men's 10,000 metres at the 1992 Summer Olympics representing Lesotho. At the 1994 IAAF World Cross Country Championships, he represented South Africa.

References

1965 births
Living people
Athletes (track and field) at the 1992 Summer Olympics
Lesotho male long-distance runners
Olympic athletes of Lesotho
South African male cross country runners
Place of birth missing (living people)